Canton is an unincorporated community in the town of Sumner, Barron County, Wisconsin, United States.

Canton was platted in 1884 when the railroad was extended to that point. A post office called Canton was established in 1882, and remained in operation until 1985.

References

Unincorporated communities in Barron County, Wisconsin
Unincorporated communities in Wisconsin